Indian Creek is a stream in Iron and Washington counties of eastern Missouri. It is a tributary of Courtois Creek.

The source is located in northern Iron County and the confluence with Courtois Creek is in southwest Washington County.  The headwaters are along Missouri Route 32 just east of Bixby and the stream flows north to the east of Viburnum and into the southwest corner of Washington County to its confluence at Courtois.

Indian Creek was named for traces of Native American settlement found along its course.

See also
List of rivers of Missouri

References

Rivers of Iron County, Missouri
Rivers of Washington County, Missouri
Rivers of Missouri
Native American history of Missouri